Lawrence S. "Larry" Solway (13 August 1928 – 9 January 2012) was a Canadian actor and broadcaster.

Career
During the 1960s he hosted radio programmes at CHUM in Toronto such as the early Canadian talk show Speak Your Mind. He left the station in 1970 due to a dispute with the station over a series of shows on sex. In the aftermath, he wrote The Day I Invented Sex about the controversy.

Solway was known nationally as a panelist of the CBC Television programme This Is the Law in the early 1970s. He returned to the radio talk show circuit later that decade with Talkback on Brampton, Ontario station CHIC until management there dismissed him without warning. He was seen in minor roles in films such as Meatballs and The Brood. In the late 1970s he was a columnist for the newly launched Sunday Star.

He was a candidate for the Ontario New Democratic Party in the 1999 Ontario general election but was unsuccessful in his campaign in St. Paul's riding.

In a column written for Straight Goods, Solway lamented the "Christmas Envy" that he felt as a Jew.

Solway was diagnosed with bladder cancer at age 83. In November 2011 he wrote a final blog post to say goodbye to his readers. He died 9 January 2012, at Toronto General Hospital of complications arising from his bladder cancer.

Radio
 1960s: Speak Your Mind, 1050 CHUM
 September 1976 - January 1979: Talkback (CHIC)
 September 1986 – ?: Larry Solway Show, CFGM
 1989 – ?: talk show, CFLY-FM Talk show host CFRB 1991–92, Talk 640 1995-97

Television
 Hawkeye and the Last of the Mohicans, Indian characters (1957–58)
 Flashback (1966–68), panelist
 various CBC Television news features (1971–74)
 This Is the Law (1971–75), panelist - CBC
 Juliette and Friends (1973–75), co-host
 Larry Solway Show (1974–76) - syndicated
 Our Fellow Americans (1976) - 8-part CBC documentary

Film
 Meatballs (1979), interviewer
 The Brood (1979), lawyer

Books
 The Day I Invented Sex (McClelland and Stewart, 1971)
 Don't Be Blindsided by Retirement (2008). Author Andrew Bertram; Solway was a contributor.

Theatre
Solway returned to the stage from 1979 to 1984, with appearances at Neptune Halifax, Oakville, Red Barn, Teller's Cage, and the National Arts Centre. He
appeared in leading roles in "Same Time Next Year," "Plaza Suite," "The Subject Was Roses," and "Last of the Red Hot Lovers."

References

External links
 

1928 births
2012 deaths
Canadian male film actors
Canadian talk radio hosts
Canadian television personalities
Ontario New Democratic Party candidates in Ontario provincial elections
Jewish Canadian male actors
Deaths from bladder cancer
Deaths from cancer in Ontario